Alsophylax is a genus of small species of geckos, endemic to Central Asia, commonly known as even-fingered geckos. Little is known of their ecology or reproductive habits.

Species
The following six species are recognized.
Alsophylax laevis Nikolsky, 1907 - southern even-fingered gecko
Alsophylax loricatus Strauch, 1887 - Strauch's even-fingered gecko 
Alsophylax pipiens (Pallas, 1827) - even-fingered gecko  
Alsophylax przewalskii Strauch, 1887 - Xinjiang even-fingered gecko
Alsophylax szczerbaki Golubev & Sattarov, 1979 - Szczerbak's even-fingered gecko
Alsophylax tadjikiensis Golubev, 1979 - Tadjikistan even-fingered gecko

Nota bene: A binomial authority in parentheses indicates that the species was originally described in a genus other than Alsophylax.

References

Further reading
Boulenger GA. 1885. Catalogue of the Lizards in the British Museum (Natural History). Second Edition. Volume I. Geckonidæ, ... London: Trustees of the British Museum (Natural History). (Taylor and Francis, printers). xii + 436 pp. + Plates I-XXXII. (Genus Alsophylax, p. 19).
Fitzinger L. 1843. Systema Reptilium, Fasciculus Primus, Amblyglossae. Vienna: Braumüller & Seidel. 106 pp. + indices. (Alsophylax, p. 90). (in Latin).

 
Lizard genera
Taxa named by Leopold Fitzinger